Luo Zhaohui (born February 1962) is a Chinese diplomat who serves as the director of the China International Development Cooperation Agency since 18 April 2021. He previously served as Chinese Ambassador to Pakistan (2007-2010), Canada (2014-2016) and India (2016-2019).

Biography
Luo Zhaohui was born in Xiaogan, Hubei, in February 1962. In 1982, he graduated with a bachelor's degree in history from Central China Normal University and later received master's degree in history from Peking University, and worked as a part-time professor at Central China Normal University.

From 1985 to 1989, he served as attaché and Third Secretary of the Department of Asian Affairs within the Ministry of Foreign Affairs. He severed as the Third Secretary and Second Secretary at the Chinese Embassy in India from 1989 to 1993.

From 1993 to 1996, he served as the Second Secretary and deputy director of the Department of American and Oceanian Affairs at Ministry of Foreign Affairs. Luo served as the Second Secretary and First Secretary of the Chinese Embassy in the United States from 1996 to 2000 and from 2000 to 2003, he served as Counselor of the Asian Department of the Ministry of Foreign Affairs. From 2003 to 2004, he served as Minister Counselor at the Chinese Embassy in Singapore.

From 2004 to 2006, he served as Deputy Director-General of the Department of Asian Affairs at the Foreign Ministry. He served as the Chinese Ambassador to Pakistan from 2007 through 2010. From June 2010, he served as Director-General of the Department of Foreign Security Affairs of the Foreign Ministry.

In March 2011, he was appointed as Director-General of the Department of Asian Affairs of the Ministry of Foreign Affairs. From May 2014 to September 2016, he served as the Chinese Ambassador to Canada and on 2016, he was appointed as the Chinese Ambassador to India, succeeding Le Yucheng. He served this position until May 2019 and on the same month, he succeeded Kong Xuanyou as Vice-Minister of Foreign Affairs.

In April 2021, he was appointed as the director of the China International Development Cooperation Agency, succeeding Wang Xiaotao.

Personal life
Luo is married to Jiang Yili, a diplomat and a scholar of Indian philosophy and religion, and politics of South Asia. The couple have a daughter.

Foreign honors
Hilal-i-Quaid-i-Azam (Pakistan, January 2009)
Sitara-i-Quaid-i- Azam (Pakistan, 2007)
Lifetime Achievement in Diplomacy Award of the Unity International Foundation (India, May 2019)

References

1962 births
Living people
People from Xiaogan
Ambassadors of China to Pakistan
Ambassadors of China to Canada
Ambassadors of China to India
Recipients of Hilal-i-Quaid-i-Azam
Central China Normal University alumni
Academic staff of the Central China Normal University
Peking University alumni
Chinese Communist Party politicians from Hubei
People's Republic of China politicians from Hubei
Chinese expatriates in the United States
Chinese expatriates in Singapore